Đức Phong may refer to several places in Vietnam:

Đức Phong, Bình Phước, a township and capital of Bù Đăng District
, a rural commune of Mộ Đức District
Former name of Bù Đăng District